Vermont Route 8A (VT 8A) is a  state highway in Windham County, Vermont, United States. It is the northward continuation of Massachusetts' Route 8A, running entirely in the town of Whitingham. The road is numbered as a state route but is maintained by the town of Whitingham as a class-2 town highway. For this reason, it is signed with a black-and-white circular shield; however, one green-and-white shield exists at VT 112's northern end that erroneously denotes VT 8A as a state-maintained highway.

VT 8A is an extension of Massachusetts Route 8A and its extension in Vermont is unrelated to VT 8.

Route description

VT 8A begins at the Massachusetts–Vermont state line as a northern continuation of Route 8A-L in the town of Whitingham. VT 8A runs north as a two-lane rural highway, crossing through Whitingham, soon gaining the moniker of Stage Road near the junction of McMillan Road. After a short northwestern jog, the route turns north at Burrington Hill Road, passing the rural Fire Fox Road, and turning northeast along the valley. The route soon bends north again, paralleling the East Branch of the North River, entering the town of Halifax. After the town line, VT 8A reaches a junction with VT 112, which runs north to the community of Jacksonville and south to the Massachusetts state line and Route 112.

Major intersections

References

External links

008A
Transportation in Windham County, Vermont